The Darwin Airport Resort Territory Stingers aka NT Stingers are a men's Australian field hockey team, representing Northern Territory in the Australian Hockey League.

References

Australian field hockey clubs
field hockey
Sports teams in the Northern Territory